Manchester is a city in Northwest England.  The M19 postcode area is to the south of the city centre, and contains the areas of Burnage, and Levenshulme.  The postcode area contains five listed buildings that are recorded in the National Heritage List for England.  Of these, one is listed at Grade II*, the middle grade of the three grades, and the others are at Grade II, the lowest grade.  The areas are mainly residential, and all the five listed buildings are churches.


Key

Buildings

References

Citations

Sources

Lists of listed buildings in Greater Manchester
Buildings and structures in Manchester